The Jaren Crags are a row of rock peaks in the form of a bluff, just west of Storkvarvet Mountain in the Mühlig-Hofmann Mountains of Queen Maud Land, Antarctica. They were plotted from surveys and air photos by the Sixth Norwegian Antarctic Expedition (1956–60) and named Jaren (the edge).

References

Cliffs of Queen Maud Land
Princess Astrid Coast